Olga Spiridonović (11 June 1923 – 14 May 1994) was a Serbian film, theatre and television actress who starred in a number of Yugoslav films.

References

External links
 

1923 births
1994 deaths
Actors from Split, Croatia
Serbs of Croatia
Serbian television actresses
Serbian film actresses
Yugoslav actresses
Golden Arena winners